John F. Kennedy High School is one of two public high schools located in Bloomington, Minnesota, United States. Named after former president John F. Kennedy, it was opened in 1965 due to the rapid growth of Bloomington at the time.

Athletics
The school had been a member of the Lake Conference since the school opened but left the Lake Conference after the 2009–10 school year to become part of the new South Suburban Conference. In 2014, Kennedy joined the new Metro West Conference. In 2022, Kennedy joined the Tri-Metro Conference.

Performing arts
Kennedy has four competitive show choirs, the mixed-gender "Rhythm in Gold", the all-female "East Side Swingers", the all-men "Men in Motion" and the intermediate mixed-gender "Blue and Gold Velvet", which debuted during the 2022 competitive season. The program also hosts an annual competition. It also has a large instrumental music department, divided into a band section and an orchestra.

Notable alumni
Patrick Casey - writer, actor, director and author
Peter Docter, film director, animator, screenwriter, producer and voice actor 
Kent Hrbek, Major League Baseball player
Don Jackson, National Hockey League player and coach
Marcus LeVesseur, professional fighter in the UFC
Pat Mazorol, Minnesota state representative
Josh "Worm" Miller - filmmaker, writer, director, and actor
 Gordy Morgan, Olympic wrestler
John Morgan, Olympic wrestler
Marty Morgan, NCAA All-American wrestler
Steve Rushin, writer
Jenna Smith, college and professional basketball player
Ryan Stoa, professional ice hockey player
Melissa Halvorson Wiklund, Minnesota state senator

See also
Bloomington Jefferson High School
Bloomington Lincoln High School

References

External links 
 
 

Buildings and structures in Bloomington, Minnesota
High schools in Bloomington, Minnesota
Educational institutions established in 1965
Public high schools in Minnesota
1965 establishments in Minnesota